The Carpe Diem Tour was a headlining concert tour by American recording artist Chris Brown, in support of his fifth studio album Fortune. The tour included shows in Europe, Africa, Asia, and Trinidad. It began on November 14, 2012 in Denmark and ended on December 27, 2012 in Trinidad.

Background
In May 2012, boy band The Wanted revealed to Capital FM that Brown was planning to launch a tour in the United States in July of the same year to support his fifth studio album, Fortune, and that there was a possibility they could be one of the supporting acts for the tour. Tom Parker, a member of the band, stated: "There's talk about us, he's got his American tour coming up in July, maybe we'll go on that for a few shows which will be cool". However, details for a tour were not announced until September 25, 2012, when twelve dates for European venues were revealed. An extra date for the European leg was announced on September 26, 2012. The African tour dates were announced on September 28, 2012.

Setlist
The following set list is representative of the show on December 5, 2012. It is not representative of all concerts for the duration of the tour.
 "Beautiful People"
 "I Can Only Imagine"
 "Forever"
 "She Ain't You"
 "Take It to the Head"
 "Birthday Cake"
 "Take You Down"
 "Biggest Fan"
 "2012"
 "No Bullshit"
 "I Can Transform Ya"
 "Bassline"
 "Look At Me Now"
 "Deuces"
 "All Back"
 "Don't Judge Me"
 "Yeah 3x"
 "Don't Wake Me Up"
 "Turn Up The Music"

Dates

Personnel
 Choreography - Anwar "Flii Stylz" Burton, Christopher Brown, Richmond "Rich" Talauega and Anthony "Tone" Talauega
 Creative Direction - Anwar "Flii Stylz" Burton, Josh Thomas and Christopher Brown
 Art Direction - Shaun Harrison 
 Graphic Designer - Cooper Sebastian
 Stage Director - Steven Bryson
 Production Manager - Michael "Huggy" Carter
 Stylist - Seth Chernoff
 Dancers - Kento Mori, Mona Berntsen, Hefa Leone Tuita, J.D Rainey, Jack Fletcher, Roi Chen, Devon Perri, Timor Steffens, Taja Riley, Randi Kemper, Eyal (Pipo) Layani, Ragon Miller and Alexandria Kaye-Upshur
 DJ - DJ Babey Drew

Source:

References

2012 concert tours
Chris Brown concert tours

pt:Fortune (álbum)#Carpe Diem Tour